Syrphus vitripennis is a very common European and North American species of hoverfly. Its larvae feed on aphids

Description
For terms see Morphology of Diptera
Wing length 7·25-10·25 mm. Frons above lunulae black. Tergites 3 and 4 with entire yellow bands and lateral margin of tergites black. Male: femora 3 black for basal three-quarters. Female: femora 3 black on basal two-thirds. The male genitalia and the larva are figured by Dusek and Laska (1964). See references for determination.

Distribution
Palearctic Throughout. Nearctic Alaska to California. 
 Migratory.

Biology
Habitat: Deciduous and coniferous woodland and anthropophilic, occurring along field hedges, in suburban gardens and parks. Flies March to October.

References

Syrphinae
Syrphini
Insects described in 1822
Diptera of Europe